Bufadienolide is a chemical compound with steroid structure. Its derivatives are collectively known as bufadienolides, including many in the form of bufadienolide glycosides (bufadienolides that contain structural groups derived from sugars). These are a type of cardiac glycoside, the other being the cardenolide glycosides. Both bufadienolides and their glycosides are toxic; specifically, they can cause an atrioventricular block, bradycardia (slow heartbeat), ventricular tachycardia (a type of rapid heartbeat), and possibly lethal cardiac arrest.

Etymology 
The term derives from the toad genus Bufo that contains bufadienolide glycosides, the suffix -adien- that refers to the two double bonds in the lactone ring, and the ending -olide that denotes the lactone structure. Consequently, related structures with only one double bond are called bufenolides, and the saturated equivalent is bufanolide.

Classification 
According to MeSH, bufadienolides and bufanolides are classified as follows:

Polycyclic compounds
Steroids
Cardanolides
Cardiac glycosides			
Bufanolides (includes bufenolides, bufadienolides, bufatrienolides)
Proscillaridin
Daigremontianin
Cardenolides

References

Further reading
 Steyn, PS; Heerden, FR van (1998). Bufadienolides of plant and animal origin, Natural Product Reports, 15(4):397-413.

Bufanolides